Bass is Base was a Canadian R&B group based in North York, Ontario.

History
In 1993, Chin Injeti and Ivana Santilli were in the music group Syndicate 305. At the 1993 Music West conference in Vancouver, Injeti and Santilli met MC Mystic (Roger Mooking), who at the time was in a group called The Maximum Definitive. A few months later, Mystic invited the pair to back him for his group's performance at the Canadian Music Video Awards. The trio then formed the group Bass is Base that year with Injeti on bass, Santilli on keyboards, and Mystic on percussion. All three members contributed vocals, Injeti and Santilli as singers and Mystic as a rapper. 

The group's first gig was opening for Jamiroquai. The group also opened for The Pharcyde. In the spring of 1994, the group released their debut album, First Impressions for the Bottom Jigglers. The album was released through their self-created label, SoulShack. They also released an eponymous single from the album, "Funkmobile", which was played on Much Music. The album went on to sell more than 20,000 copies in Canada. In October 1994, the group signed a co-venture deal with A&M Records and Loose Cannon Records in the U.S. The group won a Juno Award in the Best R&B/Soul Recording category in 1995.

In 1994 and 1995, the group toured through Canada with Barenaked Ladies and the Crash Test Dummies. On September 27, 1995, the group released their Memories of the Soul Shack Survivors album in Canada. The album peaked at #38 on the RPM Canadian albums chart. The album was released in the US on April 16, 1996. They released one top 40 hit, "I Cry". 

In May 1997, Bass is Base broke up and all members pursued solo endeavours.

Aftermath
After Bass is Base disbanded, Santilli went on to a release four solo albums. Injeti works as a producer and bass player; in 2005 he produced "hick-hop" artist Ridley Bent's debut release, Blam. Mooking left the music business, working as a chef in Toronto and as an entrepreneur in the food industry; he returned to release two albums of soul music in 2008 and 2013.

Discography

Singles
1994 "Funkmobile" (Soul Shack)
1995 "Straw Stix & Brix" (Soul Shack)
1995 "Westside Funk" (Soul Shack)
1995 "Diamond Dreams" (Loose Cannon/A&M Records)
1995 "Floating" (Loose Cannon/A&M)
1996 "I Cry" (Loose Cannon/A&M)
1996 "Why" (Loose Cannon/A&M)

Albums
1994 First Impressions for the Bottom Jigglers
1995 Memories of the Soul Shack Survivors

References

External links
Bass is Base at Discogs

Musical groups established in 1993
Musical groups disestablished in 1997
Musical groups from Toronto
North York
Canadian contemporary R&B musical groups
Canadian soul music groups
1993 establishments in Ontario
1997 disestablishments in Ontario
Juno Award for R&B/Soul Recording of the Year winners